La bonne soupe (also known as Careless Love) is a 1964 French film directed by Robert Thomas.

Plot 
A French woman recounts her many complicated romances to a casino croupier.

Cast
Annie Girardot as Marie-Paule (young)
Marie Bell as Marie-Paule (older)
Gérard Blain as Painter
Bernard Blier as Monsieur Joseph
Jean-Claude Brialy as Jacquot
Blanchette Brunoy as Angèle
Claude Dauphin as Monsieur Oscar
Sacha Distel as Roger
Daniel Gélin as Raymond
Denise Grey as Madame Boudard
Jane Marken as Madame Alphonse
Christian Marquand as Lucien Volard

Reception
According to Fox records, the film needed to earn $1,800,000 in film rentals to break even and made $1,110,000, meaning it lost money.

References

External links
La Bonne Soupe at TCMDB

1964 films
1960s French films